Tefillin (Israeli Hebrew:  / ;), or phylacteries, are a set of small black leather boxes with leather straps containing scrolls of parchment inscribed with verses from the Torah. Tefillin are worn by adult Jews during weekday morning prayers. In Orthodox and traditional communities, they are worn solely by men, while some Reform and Conservative (Masorti) communities allow them to be worn by both men and women.  By traditional Jewish Law (halacha), women are exempt from most time-dependent positive commandments.

Although "tefillin" is technically the plural form (the singular being "tefillah"), it is often used as a singular as well. The arm-tefillah (or shel yad [literally "of the hand"]) is placed on the upper (non-dominant) arm, and the strap wrapped around the forelimb, hand and middle finger; while the head-tefillah (or shel rosh [literally "of the head"]) is placed between the eyes at the boundary of the forehead and hair.  They are intended to fulfill the Torah's instructions to maintain a continuous "sign" and "remembrance" of the Exodus from Egypt, as they were originally worn all day, from sunrise to sunset.

The biblical verses often cited as referring to tefillin are obscure. Deuteronomy , for instance, does not designate explicitly what specifically to "bind upon your arm", and the definition of "totafot between your eyes" is not obvious. These details are delineated in the Oral Torah. However, Karaite Judaism understands the verses to be metaphorical.

Biblical source 
The obligation of tefillin is mentioned four times in the Torah: twice when recalling The Exodus from Egypt:

and twice in the shema passages:

Etymology 
 
The first texts to use "tefillin" are the Targumim and Peshitta and it is also used in subsequent Talmudic literature, although the word "ṭoṭafah" was still current, being used with the meaning of "frontlet".

The ultimate origin of Hebrew "tefillin" is uncertain. "Tefillin" may have derived from the Aramaic , "to plead, pray", a word closely related to the Hebrew , "prayer". Jacob ben Asher (14th century) suggests that "tefillin" is derived from the Hebrew , "justice, evidence", for tefillin act as a sign and proof of God's presence among the Jewish people.

The Biblical word , too, is of disputed etymology. Some believe it refers to a charm, similar to the Hebrew , "round jewel". The Talmud explains that the word  is combination of two foreign words:  means "two" in the "Katpi" language (Jastrow proposes: Coptic) and  means "two" in the "Afriki" language, hence,  and  means "two and two", corresponding to the four compartments of the head-tefillin. According to Jeffrey H. Tigay the word meant "headband" and was derived from a root meaning "to encircle", as ornamental bands encircling the head were common among Levantine populations in the biblical period.

The English word "phylactery" ("phylacteries" in the plural) derives from Ancient Greek   (  in the plural), meaning "guarded post, safeguard, security", and in later Greek, "amulet" or "charm". The word "phylactery" occurs once (in ACC PL) in the Greek New Testament, whence it has passed into the languages of Europe. Neither Aquila nor Symmachus uses "phylacteries" in their translations. The choice of this particular Greek equivalent to render the Heb. tefillin bears witness to the ancient functional interpretation of the said device as a kind of an amulet.

Purpose
The tefillin are to serve as a reminder of God's intervention at the time of the Exodus from Egypt. Maimonides details of the sanctity of tefillin and writes that "as long as the tefillin are on the head and on the arm of a man, he is modest and God-fearing and will not be attracted by hilarity or idle talk; he will have no evil thoughts, but will devote all his thoughts to truth and righteousness". The Sefer ha-Chinuch (14th century) adds that the purpose of tefillin is to help subjugate a person's worldly desires and encourage spiritual development. Joseph Caro (16th century) explains that tefillin are placed on the arm adjacent to the heart and on the head above the brain to demonstrate that these two major organs are willing to perform the service of God.

Many have the custom to have high-quality tefillin and beautiful tefillin bags as a Hiddur Mitzvah. This idea comes from the verse "This is my God and I will glorify Him". The Jewish Sages explain: "Is it possible for a human being to add glory to his Creator? What this really means is: I shall glorify Him in the way I perform mitzvot. I shall prepare before Him a beautiful lulav, beautiful sukkah, beautiful fringes (Tsitsit), and beautiful phylacteries (Tefilin)."

Some non-Orthodox scholars think that tefillin may play an apotropaic function. For instance, Yehudah B. Cohn argues that the tefillin should be perceived as an invented tradition aimed at counteracting the popularity of the Greek amulets with an "original" Jewish one. Joshua Trachtenberg considered every ornament worn on the body (whatever its declared function) as initially serving the purpose of an amulet. In addition, the early Rabbinic sources furnish more or less explicit examples of the apotropaic qualities of tefillin. For instance, Numbers Rabbah 12:3 presents tefillin as capable of defeating "a thousand demons" emerging on "the left side", rabbis Yohanan and Nahman used their sets to repel the demons inhabiting privies, whereas Elisha the Winged, who was scrupulous in performing this mitzvah, was miraculously saved from the Roman persecution. Also, tefillin are believed to possess life-lengthening qualities, and they are often listed in one breath among various items which are considered amuletic in nature.

Manufacture and contents 

The manufacturing processes of tefillin are intricate and governed by hundreds of detailed rules.

Boxes
In earlier Talmudic times, tefillin were either cylindrical or cubical, but later the cylindrical form became obsolete. Nowadays the boxes should be fashioned from a single piece of animal hide and form a base with an upper compartment to contain the parchment scrolls. They are made in varying levels of quality. The most basic form, called peshutim ("simple"), are made using several pieces of parchment to form the inner walls of the head tefillin. The higher quality tefillin, namely dakkot ("thin"), made by stretching a thin piece of leather, and the more durable gassot ("thick") are both fashioned from the single piece of hide.

The main box which holds the tefillin scrolls, known as ketzitzah (קציצה), is cubical. Below it is a wider base known as the titura (תיתורא). At the back of the titura is a passageway (ma'avarta, מעברתא) through which the tefillin strap is threaded, to tie the tefillin in place.

On both sides of the head-tefillin, the Hebrew letter shin is moulded; the shin on the wearer's left side has four branches instead of three.

Straps
Black leather straps (retsu'ot) pass through the rear of the base and are used to secure the tefillin onto the body.  The knot of the head-tefillin strap forms the letter dalet or double dalet (known as the square-knot) while the strap that is passed through the arm-tefillin is formed into a knot in the shape of the letter yud. Together with the shin on the head-tefillin box, these three letters spell Shaddai, one of the names of God.

The straps must be black on their outer side, but may be any color except red on their inner side. A stringent opinion requires them to be black on the inner side too, but more commonly the inner side is left the color of leather.

The Talmud specifies that tefillin straps must be long enough to reach one's middle finger, and records the practice of Rav Aha bar Jacob to tie and then "matleit" (plait? wind three times?) them. However, the passage leaves unclear where the measuring is done from, whether the reference is to hand- or head-tefillin, and what exactly the meaning of "matleit" is. Combining and interpreting the Talmud's statements, Maimonides, Tur, and Shulchan Aruch ruled that the strap of hand-tefillin must reach from where the tefillin is placed on the arm, as far as the middle finger, where it must be wound three times around the middle finger. Rema wrote that it is not necessary to wind around the finger (rather, the straps must be long enough that one could wind around the finger); however, this leniency does not appear in his comments to the Shulchan Aruch. In addition to the windings around the finger, the Shulchan Aruch states that the custom is to wind six or seven times around the forearm.

Parchment scrolls 

The four biblical passages which refer to the tefillin, mentioned above, are written on scrolls and placed inside the leather boxes. The arm-tefillin has one large compartment, which contains all four biblical passages written upon a single strip of parchment; the head-tefillin has four separate compartments in each of which one scroll of parchment is placed. This is because the verses describe the hand-tefillin in the singular ("sign"), while in three of four verses, the head-tefillin is described in the plural ("totafot").

The passages are written by a scribe with special ink on parchment scrolls (klaf). These are: "Sanctify to me ..." (Exodus 13:1–10); "When YHWH brings you ..." (Exodus 13:11–16); "Hear, O Israel ..." (Deuteronomy 6:4–9); and "If you observe My Commandments ..." (Deuteronomy 11:13-21). The Hebrew Ashuri script must be used and there are three main styles of lettering used: Beis Yosef – generally used by Ashkenazim; Arizal – generally used by Hasidim; Velish – used by Sefardim. 

The texts have to be written with halachically acceptable (acceptable according to Jewish law) ink on halachically acceptable parchment. There are precise rules for writing the texts and any error invalidates it. For example, the letters of the text must be written in order - if a mistake is found later, it can't be corrected as the replacement letter would have been written out of sequence. There are 3188 letters on the parchments, and it can take a sofer (scribe) as long as 15 hours to write a complete set.  The scribe is required to imerse in a mikvah (ritual bath) before starting work.

Ordering of scrolls (Rashi and Rabbeinu Tam tefillin)

Talmudic commentators debated the order in which scrolls should be written in the hand tefillin and inserted into the four compartments of the head-tefillin. Rashi held that the passages are placed according to the chronological order as they appear in the Torah (Kadesh Li, Ve-haya Ki Yeviehcha, Shema, Ve-haya Im Shemoa), while according to Rabbeinu Tam, the last two passages are switched around. There are two additional opinions of the Shimusha Rabba and the Raavad, who hold that like Rashi and Rabbeinu Tam respectively, but they hold that the scrolls are placed in the head tefillin in mirror image of those opinions.

It is often claimed that of the tefillin dating from the 1st-century CE discovered at Qumran in the Judean Desert, some were made according to the order understood by Rashi and others in the order of Rabbeinu Tam; however, they in fact do not follow either opinion.

Nowadays, the prevailing custom is to arrange the scrolls according to Rashi's view, but some pious Jews are also accustomed to briefly lay the tefillin of Rabbeinu Tam as well, a custom of the Ari adopted by the Hasidim. The Vilna Gaon, who wore the tefillin of Rashi, rejected the stringency of also laying Rabbeinu Tam, pointing out that there were 64 possible arrangements of the tefillin scrolls, and it would not be practical to put on 64 different sets of tefillin to account for all possibilities. The Shulchan Aruch rules that only "one who is known and famous for his piety" should put on Rabbeinu Tam tefillin, while the Mishnah Brurah explains that if any other person puts on Rabbeinu Tam tefillin, it is a sign of arrogance.

The placement of the protrusion of a tuft of calf hairs (se'ar eigel) identifies as to which opinion the tefillin were written.

Obligation and gender

The duty of laying tefillin rests upon Jews after the age of thirteen years. Women were traditionally exempt from the obligation; the Rema (Rav Moses Isserles, 16th century), a major codifier of the Jewish law, strongly discourages it.

Historically, the mitzvah of tefillin was not performed by women, but the ritual was apparently kept by some women in medieval France and Germany. It has been claimed Rashi's daughters and the wife of Chaim ibn Attar wore tefillin, but there is no historical evidence for these claims.

In modern times, people of all genders choose to wear tefillin, and are encouraged to do so by some. In 2018, a group of students from Hebrew College, a non-denominational rabbinical school in Boston, created a series of YouTube videos to help people of all genders learn how to wrap tefillin. Within the Orthodox movement, it remains a male-only obligation, but in egalitarian movements, others may observe this practice. Women affiliated with the Conservative movement wrap tefillin. Since 2013, SAR High School in Riverdale, New York, has allowed girls to wrap tefillin during morning prayer; it is probably the first Modern Orthodox high school in the U.S. to do so. The wearing of tefillin by members of Women of the Wall at the Western Wall caused consternation from the rabbi in charge of the site until a Jerusalem District Court judge ruled in 2013 that doing so was not a violation of "local custom".

A mourner during the first day of their mourning period is exempt from wrapping tefillin; according to Talmudic law, a bridegroom on his wedding-day is also exempt, but this later exemption is not practiced today. A sufferer from stomach-trouble or one who is otherwise in pain and cannot concentrate their mind is also exempt. One who is engaged in the study of the Law and scribes of and dealers in tefillin and mezuzahs while engaged in their work if it cannot be postponed, are also free from this obligation.

The codes view the commandment of tefillin as important, and call those who neglect to observe it "transgressors". Maimonides counts the commandment of laying the arm-tefillin and head-tefillin as two separate positive mitzvot. The Talmud cites Rav Sheshet, who said that by neglecting the precept, one transgresses eight positive commandments. A report of widespread laxity in its observance is reported by Moses of Coucy in 13th-century Spain. It may have arisen from the fear of persecution, similar to what had occurred to the Jews living in the Land of Israel under Roman rule in the second century.

Use
 

Originally tefillin were worn all day, but not during the night. Nowadays the prevailing custom is to wear them only during the weekday morning service, although some individuals wear them at other times during the day as well. Observant Jews make a tremendous effort to don Tefillin at the appropriate time every morning, even in crowded airports or while summiting the world's highest peaks. 
Tefillin are not donned on Shabbat and the major festivals because these holy days are themselves considered "signs" which render the need of the "sign" of tefillin superfluous.

On the fast day of Tisha B'Av, Ashkenazim and some Sephardim do not wear tefillin during the morning (Shacharit) service and they are worn instead at the afternoon service (Mincha). Other Sephardim (following the Kabbalah) wear put on tefillin at Shacharit as usual.

Chol HaMoed

On Chol HaMoed (intermediate days) of Pesach and Sukkot, there is a great debate among the early halachic authorities as to whether tefillin should be worn or not. Those who forbid it consider the "sign" of intermediate days as having the same status as the festival itself, making the ritual of tefillin redundant. Others argue and hold that Chol HaMoed does not constitute a "sign" in which case tefillin must be laid. Three customs evolved resulting from the dispute:
To refrain from wearing tefillin: This ruling of the Shulchan Aruch is based on kabbalah and the Zohar which strongly advocate refraining from laying tefillin on Chol HaMoed. This position is maintained by Sephardic Jews and is also the opinion of the Vilna Gaon whose ruling has been almost universally accepted in Israel.
To wear tefillin without reciting the blessings: This is the opinion of, among others, Rabbi Jacob ben Asher (Ba'al ha-Turim), Rabbi Moses of Coucy (Semag) and Rabbi David HaLevi Segal (Turei Zahav). The advantage of this compromise is that one avoids the transgressions of either not donning tefillin or making a blessing in vain.
To wear tefillin and recite the blessings in an undertone: This opinion is the ruling of Moses Isserles who writes that this is the universally accepted practice among Ashkenazic Jews. However it may have been in his time, this is no longer universally the case, since many Ashkenazim refrain from wearing it or wear it without a blessing during Chol HaMoed.

In light of the conflicting opinions, the Mishna Berura (early 20th-century), following the second compromise practice above, recommends Ashkenazim make the following stipulation before donning tefillin: "If I am obligated to don tefillin I intend to fulfill my obligation and if I am not obligated to don tefillin, my doing so should not be considered as fulfilling any obligation" and that the blessing not be recited.

Laws and customs regarding putting on tefillin 

Ashkenazi practice is to put on and remove the arm tefillin while standing in accordance to the Shulchan Aruch, while most Sephardim do so while sitting in accordance with the Ari. All, however, put on and remove the head tefillin while standing. Halacha forbids speaking or being distracted while putting on the tefillin. An Ashkenazi says two blessings when laying tefillin, the first before he ties the arm-tefillin: ...lehani'ach tefillin ("to bind tefillin"), and the second after placing the head tefillin: ...al mitzvat tefillin ("as to the commandment of tefillin"); thereafter, he tightens the head straps and says "Baruch Shem Kovod..." ("blessed be the holy name"). The Sephardic custom is that no blessing is said for the head-tefillin, the first blessing sufficing for both. Sephardim and many members of the Chabad Orthodox movement only recite the blessing on the head-tefillah if they spoke about something not related to tefillin since reciting the blessing on the arm-tefillah.

The arm-tefillin is laid on the inner side of the bare left arm, right arm if one is left handed, two finger breadths above the elbow, so that when the arm is bent the tefillin faces towards the heart. The arm-tefillin is tightened with the thumb, the blessing is said, and the strap is immediately wrapped around the upper arm in the opposite direction it came from in order to keep the knot tight without having to hold it. Some wrap it around the upper arm for less than a full revolution (the bare minimum to keep the knot tight) and then wrap it around the forearm seven times, while others wrap it around the upper arm an additional time before wrapping it around the forearm. Many Ashkenazim and Italian Jews wear the knot to be tightened (not to be confused with the knot on the base which is permanently tied and always worn on the inside, facing the heart) on the inside and wrap inward, while most Nusach Sephard Ashkenazim and Sephardim wear it on the outside and wrap outward.

Then the head-tefillin is placed on the middle of the head just above the forehead, so that no part rests below the hairline. A bald or partially bald person's original hairline is used. The knot of the head-tefillin sits at the back of the head, upon the part of the occipital bone that protrudes just above the nape. The two straps of the head-tefillin are brought in front of the shoulders, with their blackened side facing outwards. Now the remainder of the arm-tefillin straps are wound three times around the middle finger and around the hand to form the shape of the Hebrew letter of either a shin according to Ashkenazim, or a dalet according to Sephardim. There are various customs regarding winding the strap on the arm and hand. In fact, the arm strap is looped for counter-clockwise wrapping with Ashkenazi tefillin while it is knotted for clockwise wrapping with Sephardic and Hasidic tefillin. On removing the tefillin, the steps are reversed.

Earlier, Yemenite Jews' custom was to put on arm-Tefillah and wind forearm with strap, making knot on wrist not winding a finger, and then put on head-Tefillah all made in sitting position. Later, Yemenite Jews followed by Shulchan Aruch and put on arm-Tefillah, making seven windings on forearm and three on a finger, and then put on head-Tefillah. Because according to the Shulchan Aruch head-Tefillah and arm-Tefillah are two different commandments, if both Tefillin aren’t available, then one can wear the available one alone.

German Jews also did not tie a finger earlier. But later they put on arm-Tefillah with a knot on biceps while standing, then put on head-Tefillah, and after that they wind seven wraps around forearm (counting by the seven Hebrew words of ), and three wraps around a finger.

The newest is Kabbalistic custom of Arizal, to put on arm-Tefillah and wind seven wraps on forearm while sitting, then head-Tefillah standing, after that three wraps around a finger. That is modern day common custom.

Some Western Sephardic families such as the Rodrigues-Pereira family have developed a personalized family wrapping method.

Biblical commandments

See also 
 Ktav Stam
 Tefillin Campaign

References

Further reading 
 Eider, Shimon D Halachos of Tefillin, Feldheim Publishers (2001) 
 Emanuel, Moshe Shlomo Tefillin: The Inside Story, Targum Press (1995) 
 Neiman, Moshe Chanina Tefillin: An Illustrated Guide, Feldheim Publishers (1995) 
 Rav Pinson, DovBer: Tefillin: Wrapped in Majesty (2013)

External links 

 Halachic sources and diagrams on Tefillin on a commercial site
 Many pictures and explanations about Tefillin, the parshiyot and batim
 Educational information and diagrams of tefillin on a commercial site
 Short movie about Tefillin producing process
 How to Guide to Putting on Tefillin
 One who performs all labor and activities with his left hand except for writing, should he be wearing the tefillin shel yad on his right hand?
 Illustrations on how to tie the knot (kesher) in the head phylactery, Ashkenazi and Sephardic methods, pp. 627–630 in PDF.
Enhance your knowledge regarding Tefillin at Vaad Meleches HaKodesh

Armwear
Book of Deuteronomy
Book of Exodus
Hebrew calligraphy
Jewish life cycle
Jewish ritual objects
Leather clothing
Positive Mitzvoth
Religious headgear
Uses of leather in Judaism
Hebrew words and phrases in the Hebrew Bible
Hebrew words and phrases in Jewish law